Stabsfähnrich (short: StFähnr / in lists: SFR; en: Staff-fähnrich) was a military rank in the Army of the German Democratic Republic (GDR) from 1979 to 1990. 

Stabsfähnrich did belong to the autonomous "Fähnrich rank group" between commissioned officer (CO) and non-commissioned officer (NCO) ranks. The position of the "Fähnrich rank group" might have been compared to the Warrant Officer (WO) rank group in Anglophone armed forces.

The bottom up approach in that rank group was as follows:
Fähnrich WO-1, (en: Fähnrich)
Oberfähnrich (WO-2), (Senior-fähnrich)
 Stabsfähnrich WO-3, (Staff-fähnrich)
Stabsoberfähnrich WO-4, (Staff-senior-fähnrich)

References 

Glossary of German military terms

Military of East Germany
Military ranks of Germany